
Kyauktawgyi Buddha may refer to:
Kyauktawgyi Buddha Temple (Yangon)
Kyauktawgyi Buddha Temple (Mandalay)
Kyauktawgyi Buddha Temple (Amarapura)